The 1974 Atlantic Coast Conference baseball tournament was held in Raleigh, North Carolina, from April 25 through 28.  won the tournament and earned the Atlantic Coast Conference's automatic bid to the 1974 NCAA Division I baseball tournament.

Tournament

See also
College World Series
NCAA Division I Baseball Championship

References

2007 ACC Baseball Media Guide

Tournament
Atlantic Coast Conference baseball tournament
Atlantic Coast Conference baseball tournament
Atlantic Coast Conference baseball tournament
20th century in Raleigh, North Carolina
College baseball tournaments in North Carolina
Sports competitions in Raleigh, North Carolina